John Neely (May 26, 1872 – March 22, 1941) was an American male tennis player. He competed in the singles event at the 1904 Summer Olympics and reached the quarterfinal in which he lost to compatriot and eventual Olympic champion Beals Wright.

Neeley attended Princeton University, where he graduated in engineering in 1894.

On February 13, 1914, Neely, who was at that time a banker in Chicago, was shot and seriously wounded during an attempted robbery.

References

1872 births
1941 deaths
American male tennis players
Olympic tennis players of the United States
Tennis players at the 1904 Summer Olympics
Tennis players from Chicago